Tim Shaw is an Australian radio and television presenter, actor, journalist, author and  businessman. 
He has hosted the 2CC the #TimShawBreakfastShow a Canberra talk radio program from 2016 to 2019. He is a Director of the National Press Club Board since November 2017 and a member of the Federal Parliamentary Press Gallery.

Career

Television
Shaw spent 2013-2015 as Thailand Correspondent for news and current affairs for Seven Network Australia. He has appeared on Seven's Today Tonight and Nine Network's A Current Affair and on all commercial TV networks as an expert on sales and marketing. He has produced various TV and radio campaigns for clients nationally and internationally. Shaw has appeared as a panelist on TV debates as a social commentator.

During his tenure in Thailand he appeared on Phuket News TV as a commentator and as a reporter on issues affecting Australians travelling in SE Asia. He hosted afternoon radio on Phuket's Live 89.5 FM radio and produced and presented the Phuket News Hour program dedicated to news and current affairs in the ASEAN region.

Commercial spokesperson
Shaw became best known to Australian TV audiences as "The Demtel Man" between 1992-1995 as he presented as the face of an infomercial "As Seen On TV" sales company TV commercials and infomercials for Demtel International. He popularised the expression "But wait, there's more" in Australia. He was also well known for offering a free set of steak knives to anyone who placed an order within a set timeframe.

Since then he has also appeared in many TV commercials for McDonald's and Pizza Hut restaurants, presented radio shows on Sydney radio stations 2GB and 2UE, and written a best-selling book called Best Seller - Tim Shaw's Sales Success Secrets. 

From late 1999 until December 2001, Shaw was a board member of the road service mutual NRMA where he recorded the fourth highest vote in the Mutual's history in the 1998 demutualisation election as a member of the Members First team led by Nicholas Whitlam.

Radio
Shaw has hosted the 2CC Breakfast radio in Australia's national capital, Canberra.  He has previously hosted Legal Matters on Sydney radio station 2UE and network stations, along with Australia overnight program 2010–2013. He hosted the Tim Shaw Weekend morning program 1998-2000 on Sydney Radio 2GB.

Awards
Shaw was awarded a star on Caloundra's "Walk of Stars" in 2006. He won Best Current Affairs presenter 2017 and Best Talk Presenter 2019 at the Australian Commercial Radio Awards. He was a finalist in 2016 and 2018 also in those categories.

Personal life
Shaw was educated at Cromer Public School & the Pittwater House Schools on the Northern Beaches, Sydney, Australia. He attended Macquarie University and studied Media & Cultural Studies 1998-2000.

References

External links
Official Website
Legal Matters Website
Videos of Demtel Ads
Public Speaking Profile

Year of birth missing (living people)
Living people
Australian television personalities